The articulations of the heads of the ribs (or costocentral articulations) constitute a series of gliding or arthrodial joints, and are formed by the articulation of the heads of the typical ribs with the costal facets on the contiguous margins of the bodies of the thoracic vertebrae and with the intervertebral discs between them; the first, eleventh and twelfth ribs each articulate with a single vertebra.

The ligaments of the joints are:
 Intra-articular ligament of head of rib
 Radiate ligament of head of rib

Additional images

References

Thorax (human anatomy)
Joints